Mauidrillia fimbriata is an extinct species of sea snail, a marine gastropod mollusk in the family Horaiclavidae.

Description
The length of the shell attains 8 mm, its diameter 3 mm.

Distribution
This extinct marine species is endemic to New Zealand

References

 Maxwell, P.A. (2009). Cenozoic Mollusca. pp. 232–254 in Gordon, D.P. (ed.) New Zealand inventory of biodiversity. Volume one. Kingdom Animalia: Radiata, Lophotrochozoa, Deuterostomia. Canterbury University Press, Christchurch

External links
C. R. Laws (1947) Tertiary Mollusca from Hokianga District, North Auckland.; Transactions and Proceedings of the Royal Society of New Zealand (1946)

fimbriata
Gastropods described in 1947